Two local elections were held in North Korea in 1947.

Village and neighborhood( 리(동) 인민위원회선거) people's committee elections were held on February 24–25 with a 99.85% voter turnout. 86.74% of the voters voted in favor of the candidates.

Township people's committee elections(면 인민위원회 선거) were held on March 5, with a 99.98% voter turnout. 57.97% of the voters voted in favor of the candidates.

References

1947 in North Korea
North Korea
Local elections in North Korea
February 1947 events in Asia
March 1947 events in Asia